Orich may refer to:
 Steve Orich, American composer
 Orich language, a language of Russia

See also 
 Sierra de Oriche, a mountain range of Spain
 Orache, a plant
 Orech